Henry George Bohn (4 January 179622 August 1884) was a British publisher. He is principally remembered for the Bohn's Libraries which he inaugurated. These were begun in 1846, targeted the mass market, and comprised editions of standard works and translations, dealing with history, science, classics, theology and archaeology.

Biography
Bohn was born in London. He was the son of a German bookbinder who had settled in England. In 1831 he began his career as a dealer in rare books and remainders. In 1841 he issued his "Guinea" Catalogue of books, a monumental work containing 23,208 items. Bohn was noted for his book auction sales: one held in 1848 lasted four days, the catalogue comprising twenty folio pages. Printed on this catalogue was the information: "Dinner at 2 o'clock, dessert at 4, tea at 5, and supper at 10."

In 1846, he also started publishing The British florist : or lady's journal of horticulture, which had 6 volumes with illustrations and plates (coloured).

The name of Bohn is principally remembered by the important Bohn's Libraries which he inaugurated: these were begun in 1846 and comprised editions of standard works and translations, dealing with history, science, classics, theology and archaeology, consisting in all of 766 volumes. His authors included Julia Corner who created educational books about India and China for him in the 1850s.

The reasons for the success of Bohn's Libraries may have included their marketing to a general mass readership with volumes selling at low prices, their "lack of literary pretensions", and their "policy of a widespread, but restrained expurgation".

One of Bohn's most useful and laborious undertakings was his revision (6 vols. 1864) of The Bibliographer's Manual of English Literature (1834) of W. T. Lowndes. The plan includes bibliographical and critical notices, particulars of prices, etc., and a considerable addition to the original work.

It had been one of Bohn's ambitions to found a great publishing house, but, finding that his sons had no taste for the trade, he sold his Bohn's Libraries in 1864 to Messrs. Bell and Daldy, afterwards G. Bell & Sons. At that time the Bohn's Libraries included more than 600 titles. In subsequent years, he disposed of all his copyrights and business properties, finally realizing £73,000 overall.

Bohn was a man of wide culture and many interests. He himself made considerable contributions to his Libraries, he collected pictures, china and ivories, and was a famous rose-grower.

He died at Twickenham and was buried at West Norwood Cemetery.

Works
Among his own works were:
 The Origin and Progress of Printing (1857)
 Biography and Bibliography of Shakespeare (1863)
 Dictionary of Quotations (1867)
 Handbook of Proverbs
 Handbook of Games
 Guide to the Knowledge of Pottery and Porcelain

Besides his edition of Lowndes' Bibliographer's Manual, he developed an edition of Addison's works.

References

Sources

This article incorporates text from a publication now in the public domain:

Further reading
 Anderson, Patricia, Rose, Jonathan (eds.) (1991) British Literary Publishing Houses 1820-1880 (Dictionary of Literary Biography: vol. 106). Detroit, MI: Gale Research.
 Feather, John (2005). A History of British Publishing. London: Routledge.
 O'Sullivan, Carol, "Translation within the margin: The Libraries of Henry Bohn," in Milton, John, Bandia, Paul (eds.) (2009). Agents of Translation. Amsterdam: John Benjamins Publishing Company.

External links

 
 

 Derek Jones. . Retrieved on 7 September 2011.
 Bohn's Libraries. Full list of publications as at September 1879.

1796 births
1884 deaths
Burials at West Norwood Cemetery
English bibliographers
Publishers (people) from London
English male writers
19th-century English businesspeople